Vikki Wakefield (born 1970) is an Australian author who writes young adult fiction.

Career 

After a career working in banking, journalism and graphic design, Wakefield studied at TAFE and began writing.

Her first book, All I Ever Wanted, was published in 2011 and won the inaugural Adelaide Festival Award for Literature for Young Adult Fiction in 2012 and was shortlisted for the Victorian Premier's Prize for Writing for Young Adults in the same year. Two years later her second book, Friday Brown, won the same prize. It was also shortlisted for the 2013 Prime Minister’s Literary Award for young adult fiction.  In 2016 her third book, Inbetween Days, was an honour book in the Children's Book of the Year Award: Older Readers.

Wakefield's fourth book, Ballad for a Mad Girl, won the 2018 Davitt Award for best young adult novel and was shortlisted for other awards. 

This is How We Change the Ending, her fifth novel won the 2020 Children's Book of the Year Award: Older Readers. It was shortlisted for the 2020 Victorian Premier's Prize for Writing for Young Adults, the 2020 Queensland Literary Awards' Young Adult Book Award and the 2022 Adelaide Festival Awards for Literature Young Adult Fiction Award. This is How We Change the Ending, was also longlisted for the 2020 Stella Prize.

Works 

 All I Ever Wanted, Text Publishing, 2011, 
 Friday Brown, Text Publishing, 2012, 
 Inbetween Days, Text Publishing, 2015, 
 Ballad for a Mad Girl, Text Publishing, 2017, 
 This is How We Change the Ending, Text Publishing, 2019,

References

External links 
 Official website

1970 births
Living people
21st-century Australian women writers
21st-century Australian writers